This is a list of massacres in Iran.

See also
List of massacres of Nizaris

References

Iran
Massacres in Iran
Iran crime-related lists
Massacres
Massacres